Daniel, Danny or Dan Rogers may refer to: 

Daniel Rogers (politician) (1754–1806), miller and politician from Delaware
Daniel Rogers  (Puritan) (1573–1652), English Puritan clergyman
Daniel Rogers (diplomat) (1538–1591), English agent in the United Provinces
Danny Rogers (born 1994), Irish football goalkeeper
Dan Rogers, Canadian politician